Manfred Krüger (born 11 August 1952 in Krummhörn) is a former professional German footballer.

Krüger made 10 appearances in the 2. Fußball-Bundesliga for Tennis Borussia Berlin during his playing career.

References

External links
 

1952 births
Living people
People from Aurich (district)
German footballers
Association football forwards
2. Bundesliga players
Tennis Borussia Berlin players
Footballers from Lower Saxony
20th-century German people